Sean Mitchell (or variants) may refer to:

Shawn Mitchell, American politician
Sean Mitchell (filmmaker), director of Witness 11
Sean Mitchell (motocross), participated in 2013 FIM Motocross World Championship season
Sean Mitchell (Shortland Street), a character on the soap opera Shortland Street